Calonne may refer to:

 Charles Alexandre de Calonne, a French statesman
 Jacques Calonne, a Belgian artist, musician, and writer
 Michel Calonne, a French writer
 The Calonne (river), a minor tributary of the Touques (river) in Normandy
 Calonne, Wallonia, a village in the municipality of Antoing, Belgium
 Calonne-Ricouart, commune of the Pas-de-Calais department in France
 Calonne-sur-la-Lys, commune of the Pas-de-Calais department in France